Grete von Urbanitzky (9 July 1891 – 4 November 1974) was a novelist, journalist and translator, originally from what at the time of her birth was the Archbishopric of Upper Austria. She was known as a prolific writer of "entertainment novels", and for this reason has sometimes been overlooked by literary scholars in countries where "seriousness" is at a premium. Her books dealt, above all, with the position of women, and in particular of women artists, in society and in the public sphere. Prominent themes included female homosexuality, set in the context of contemporary mainstream middle-class sexual morality.

Life

Provenance and early years 
The first of her parents' five daughters, Grete von Urbanitzky was born in Linz, a midsized city and regional capital located roughly halfway between Salzburg and Vienna. Her parents had both grown up further to the east of the Austro-Hungarian empire, as members of German speaking minorities, her father in Transylvania and her mother in Cisalpine Banat.   In a series of autobiographical sketches produced during the First World War she repeatedly stressed the "Germanness" of her ancestral provenance:  it was only during the 1960s that she started to capitalise on the genealogies of her two French grandmothers, intending, it seems, to distance herself from aspects of her earlier association with German nationalist positions. She was particularly close to her father, which in literary terms is reflected in the positive presentation of patriarchal authority in her novels, but she was also exposed to German nationalist beliefs which, during this time, were contributing to a destructive unravelling of political and social cohesion in what had traditionally been a more unselfconsciously multi-ethnic Austro-Hungarian empire.

She attended the pioneering Körnerschule Lyzeum (secondary school for girls) in Linz and then a gymnasium (secondary school) in Zürich, thereby receiving, in terms of the opportunities normally available to girls during the first decade of the twentieth century, an exceptionally solid academic grounding. She stayed on in Zürich to attend lectures at the university, particularly relishing the opportunities to study Natural Sciences and Philosophy. However, after her first literary successes she broke off her studies and in 1909 relocated to Vienna.

Marriage and partnership 
During this period Grete von Urbanitzky married twice, first to Ludwig Woluszuk and secondly to Peter Johann Franz Passini. Both marriages were brief and ended in divorce, the first at the insistence of Grete's father who was horrified by the debts his daughter and her husband were accumulating. Of more lasting importance than either marriage was the informal literary partnership into which she entered with Maria "Mia" Passini, the younger sister of her second husband. The working arrangement was soon complemented by a deep and lasting friendship. The women later set up home together in 1934; and then stayed together till 1945 when Mia Passini married an Englishman.

Pre-war publications 
Urbanitzky's first publication appeared in 1911.  "Sehnsucht" (loosely, "Yearning") was a compilation of various pieces of youthful written work, dealing with a strongly romanticised perception of the artist. It was a theme that would recur in her written work throughout her life. Published two years, later "Wenn die Weiber Menschen werden ... Gedanken einer Einsamen" (loosely "If women became people ... Thoughts of a woman alone") was a more substantial and structured work. On it, she took as her starting point what she defined as Otto Weininger's "gender dichotomy".  To the predicated female archetype of "whore" and "mother" she proposed a third pigeon hole:  the woman as artist, condemned to renounce both motherhood and love. Commentators naturally interpret this as an attempt by the author to create a respectable category that she might herself aspire to inhabit, in the context of the very conservative impression that she had gained of the world (or at least of Vienna's haute bourgeoisie).

War 
During the First World War and the years that followed she published numerous pieces in daily newspapers and weekly magazines, generally writing for publications on the nationalist end of the political spectrum, such as the "Neue Grazer Tagblatt", "Alpenland", "Die Saat", "Die Deutsche Nation", "Großdeutschland" and "Vierburgenland". In her contributions she elaborated populist-nationalist and racist themes. She defined her own literary output as "work for German popular culture ("Volkstum") and the race of the humans", asserting that the destructive erosion of the German and Austrian peoples and their cultural values was a "natural necessity" to fend off an annexation of Austria to Germany. Alongside these nationalistic pieces for the conservative press, she also wrote serious articles on economics and finance, becoming a regular contributor to economic journals in 1917. She produced (subsequently largely forgotten) poems, song lyrics and operetta libretti, and according to at least one source, became involved with cabaret.

During this period Urbanitzky was in addition closely associated with the populist-nationalist mind-set through her cultural-political involvement. She organised readings in the Deutscher Schulverein, an organisation dedicated to protecting the German language in the many regions of the Austro-Hungarian empire where its status as the language of the government agencies and more broadly was increasingly under attack from a palette of alternative nationalisms and the resurgent languages accompanying them. She contributed a substantial piece to Arthur Trebitsch's 1920 anthology, "Deutscher Geist aus Österreich" (loosely, "German spirit from Austria"), which she characterised as a call to arms, addressed to the nation's poets. 1920 saw the publication of her novel "Das andere Blut". Together with her 1921 and 1922 novels, "Die Auswanderer" ("The emigrants") and "Die goldene Peitsche" ("The golden whip"), this marked her most vehemently populist period.  Commentators find the books openly racist and antisemitic, powerfully vehement in demonstrating the toxic "biological" underpinnings fundamental to the German-nationalist ideology of those times.

1920s 
Urbanitzky is one of those authors who takes care of servicing the cultural links between the postal service and "Die Neue Freie Presse" (liberal-leaning daily mass circulation newspaper),  scoffed the satirist Karl Kraus. The observation reflects the high public profile that Urbanitzky enjoyed as an author in post-war Austria, but it also hints that there was more to her work than the convoluted rantings of "one more polemicist".  After the headline grabbing aggression of her three novels between 1920 and 1922, such populist-nationalist outpourings were indeed less openly to the fore in her published work. In 1923 she teamed up with other younger leading lights of the Vienna literary establishment, including the writers Arthur Schnitzler, Raoul Auernheimer and Siegfried Trebitsch, along with the publisher Ernst Peter Tal, to set up the Austrian section of the recently established PEN International authors' association. She herself accepted appointment as "General Secretary" of the Austria branch.

During this possibly more liberal phase she published her novel "Der wilde Garten" in 1927. The book focuses on the contentious theme of lesbian love, something of which Urbanitzky by now had significant personal experience.  It formed the basis for the reputation that she subsequently enjoyed (or, depending on the circumstances, not) in that it established her as a novelist willing to deal with "slippery" sexual themes that others preferred to not to address.   There was no express distancing from the populist-nationalism and antisemitism of her previous novels, however.  The novel "Mirjams Sohn" (1926) is often portrayed as philosemitic, in that it takes a theme from Jewish history as its starting point. The book is, in reality, sufficiently nuanced to provide for a range of conflicting interpretations. It deals with the appearance of a "leader" figure in the Amsterdam ghetto during the seventeenth century, but it nevertheless employs an anti-messianic plot structure - the murder of a messiah figure by Jews - and includes glimpses of antisemitic and indeed misogynistic ideologies.

The 1920s was almost certainly Grete von Urbanitzky most productive decade. It was the period during which many of her 32 (by 1943) novels appeared, often in rapid succession and with high print-runs. She combined her writing with a job as press officer for the Vienna "Volksoper", at the same time running her own literary agency.   She was also publishing the magazine "Roman der Millionen" (loosely, "Novel for the millions") which was intended to produce a first German-language translation of a fresh novel each month. Unfortunately the magazine ceased production after the appearance of just four editions, probably for financial reasons.   Between 1925 and 1928 she worked as a contributing editor with the liberal-left daily newspaper, Der Tag.   She was also working for the aggressively anti-Marxist Neues Wiener Journal. Her private circle reflected a growing political ambivalence. She was in regular contact with high-profile members of the populist-nationalist faction, such as Arthur Trebitsch and Robert Hohlbaum, but her friends also included liberal authors - both Jewish and non-Jewish - such as Richard Specht, Herwarth Walden, Nelly Sachs, Gertrud Isolani and Felix Salten.

As the 1920s drew to a close Austria was badly impacted by the backwash from the Wall Street Crash. A return to widespread acute economic hardship was accompanied by a retreat from moderation on the political front. With politics in both Austria and Germany ever more polarised, Grete von Urbanitzky managed to sustain a strange level of political ambivalence in her novels. In 1931 and 1933 "Eine Frau erlebt die Welt" ("A Woman experiences the World") and "Karin und die Welt der Männer" ("Karin and the World of Men") were both highly successful in commercial terms. In stark contrast to the novels she was producing ten years earlier, neither can be unambiguously defined politically. Certainly both of them include clearly National Socialist position statements and both are sometimes seen as "confessional books", but they both entirely lack the strident racism that was characteristic of Austrian (and German) National Socialism at the time, and when it comes to plot development it is striking that, notably in the second of the two, fascist ideology is uncompromisingly subverted.

National Socialism 
Although Austria was only integrated into Germany in 1938, the country underwent savage political ructions of its own several years earlier, and acquired its own National Socialist post-democratic one-party dictatorship in 1933. If her novels were politically ambivalent, when it came to her own life choices and events, von Urbanitzky evidently retained her "nationalist" beliefs. During 1933 she attended a PEN International congress at Dubrovnik when a motion to condemn Nazi book burnings was discussed. The German delegation walked out in protest during the discussion. Grete von Urbanitzky, who was attending as a representative (and the General Secretary) of the Austrian section, promptly left the conference hall in sympathy with the German group.  When she returned to Vienna the Austrian section of the PEN International association broke apart, and von Urbanitzky faced widespread media criticism for the position she had taken in Dubrovnik. She also faced personal risks in Vienna on account of her open commitment to the German National Socialists. Fearing arrest if she remained any longer in Austria, in 1933 she relocated to Berlin. Once in Berlin she published a series of newspaper articles and gave a number of radio interviews, in which she called for a boycott of Austrian-Jewish authors and of other "liberal" Austrian authors. This seems to have contributed to extending significantly the German government's schedule of authors whose works were banned from publication in Germany, which traditionally had been an important market for Austrian authors.

Although reader demand meant that frequent reprints of "Karin und die Welt der Männer" continued, its author soon fell out of favour with the authorities in Germany, just as she had in Austria. In 1934, together with her friend Mia Passini, she was arrested by the security services.   They were soon released, but that was very far from being the end of the matter.   Shortly afterwards one of her novels were determined to be philosemitic. In Prussia, early in 1935, copies of  "Mirjams Sohn" (1926) were confiscated and locked away, having been deemed a danger to public safety and order.   Later her lesbian novel, "Der wilde Garten", was placed on the "List of damaging and undesirable literature" produced for the first time towards the end of 1935 by the Public Enlightenment and Propaganda Ministry.   The next year copies of two more of her books, "Eine Frau erlebt die Welt..." (1932) and "Ursula und der Kapitän" (1934) were removed from workplace libraries under an order issued by the "Reichsarbeitsgemeinschaft Deutscher Werkbüchereien".   These measures were part of a broader government move to "clean up the literature sector".

On 16 January 1936 the security services received an anonymous notification of rumours concerning the allegedly Jewish provenance of von Urbanitzky's mother (who had died only in 1931). This development came in the context of newly enacted laws effectively requiring all citizens to research their genealogical provenance sufficiently to be able to demonstrate that none of their four grandparents had been Jewish, or alternatively to demonstrate the extent to which they descended from Jewish or Roma grandparents. The extent of Jewishness that the rumours imputed to von Urbanitzky's grandmother was not, in 1936, sufficient to require "indexation", but as a high-profile novelist her racial background was nevertheless of above average interest to the authorities. Sources indicate that race-based rumours about her mother's provenance will possibly or probably have contributed to the decision that Grete von Urbanitzky and Mia Passini took to emigrate. During 1936 they relocated together to Paris.

Meanwhile, back in Germany her 1932 "Durch Himmel und Hölle" ("Through Heaven and Hell") was included on an updated version of the government's "List of damaging and undesirable literature" in 1937 on account of its allegedly pornographic content. In January 1939 von Urbanitzky was expelled from the National Chamber of Authors ("Reichsschrifttumskammer"), membership of which was normally needed in order to pursue a career as a published author in Hitler's Germany. It was nevertheless only in 1941 that her work was subject to a blanket ban in Germany, by means of inclusion on a newly extended government "List of damaging and undesirable literature". The immediate trigger for the ban was almost certainly her 1941 novel "Miliza", in which the German authorities had detected "pacifist tendencies" when it had been published (in Switzerland). By this time her Vienna-based publisher, Zsolnay Verlag, had advised her, in 1940, that he no longer wished to publish her books in what had been, since 1938, part of Germany.

Paris
In Paris von Urbanitzky wrote and in 1938 published the novel which she regarded as her most important "Unsere Liebe Frau von Paris" (loosely, "Our Lady of Paris"), along with a number of resolutely non-political "entertainment novels" that she managed to have published by Zsolnay Verlag in Vienna.   (Zsolnay was her principal publisher between 1935 and 1940.)

Swiss exile
It is unclear how long von Urbanitzky remained in Paris. By the time war broke out in 1939 or 1940 Grete von Urbanitzky and Mia Passini had moved to Switzerland where they settled together in Ticino. Switzerland was welcoming large numbers of political and race-based refugees from Nazi Germany:  the quality of the welcome was variable. Sources nevertheless note that von Urbanitzky and Passini received permanent residence permits and work permits quickly and without difficulty (though for a successful novelist whose principal intended target market remained Germany - including what before 1938 had been Austria - it is hard to see that the need for a Swiss work permit would have been pressing).  Von Urbanitzky had already been able to negotiate a publishing agreement with Morgarten Verlag, a publishing house based not in Morgarten (Zug), but in Zürich.  She continued to try and find a publisher in Germany, a far large book market, and one in which she had acquired a large and evidently faithful readership over the space of two decades. She entered into negotiations with "Kaiser Verlag" in Böhmisch-Leipa, which had found itself inside Germany (with the express agreement of governments in England and France) since 1938. Kaiser, it seemed, had no problem with negotiating a publishing agreement for Germany, but in the end the discussions nevertheless came to nothing.

The friends made their home in Lugano. Compared to other exiled writer, von Urbanitzky was in some ways in a position of privilege. She was able to write undisturbed, and publish her novels in Switzerland where she was able to earn a sufficient income from them. On the other hand, she was ostracised by others in the community of exiled authors who had made their home in Switzerland. Memories of her contribution at the 1933 PEN International in Dubrovnik remained sharp.   Later the women left Lugano, moving across to Ascona on the shores of Lake Maggiore, across the mountains to the north-west.

In her written work, she responded to her 1939 ejection from the "Reichsschrifttumskammer" by producing what seemed to her to be consciously non-political novels such as "Es begann im September" (1940) and "Miliza" (1941), both of which were published in Switzerland by Scherz Verlag. The novels dealt with themes such as francophilia and European internationalism. There was a strong anti-war strand. In this way she finally distanced herself unambiguously from the populist-nationalist position to which she had previously, demonstrating a chameleon-like propensity for adapting her ideological convictions to her surroundings. After 1942, when it became clear that any return to Germany in the foreseeable future was out of the question, von Urbanitzky distanced herself from any form of totalitarian rule in "Der große Traum" (1942, "The Big Dream") and "Der Mann Alexander" (1943).  After the end of the war, when Mia Passini went off to London to marry Henry Crowe in 1946, she remained in Switzerland, only now "discovering" the truly multi-national nature of her mother's genealogy.

From now on she completely ignored her own earlier National Socialist involvement, using the German government's 1941 blanket ban on her works to present herself as having been persecuted and victimized by the Nazis.  Having been persuaded to flee the country in 1936 on account of intensified attention from the security services, following rumours of her own insufficiently Aryan genealogy,  might indeed have been seen as tantamount to being forced to leave, especially in view of the Shoah implemented by the German government after 1941. From Switzerland she reinstated her literary agency, which provided an apparently modest income. She also worked in Geneva as a correspondent at the United Nations Office there.   She found that it was no longer popular to build further on her former success as a novelist. New editions in 1948 and 1949 of "Der Mann Alexander" and "Es begann im September" met with only limited success.  Even if von Urbanitzky had set aside her enthusiastic support for the Hitler government back in 1933, others had not. During 1948 she negotiated a promising publishing agreement with Desch Verlag in Munich, but in October of that year the publisher pulled out at the last minute, responding to objections over the deal received from the journalist-author (and committed anti-Nazi) Elisabeth Castonier.

In 1965, slightly implausibly, von Urbanitzky received and accepted a request from Bruno Kreisky - at that time serving as the Austrian Foreign Minister - that she should write a book about Austria from the perspective of an Austrian émigré.  One cynical commentator suggests that von Urbanitzky's own well documented attitude towards "official" Austria had set her up for this unconventional commission.    Shortly after agreement was reached Kreisky lost his ministerial position as a result of the 1966 general election, and the new government evidently felt itself under no obligation to pursue the matter. The book was nevertheless written, and the manuscript was found among von Urbanitzky's papers after she died.

During the final part of her life Grete von Urbanitzky seems to have been based in Geneva. By the time that she died there, on 4 November 1974, she was alone, suffering from alcoholism, and almost completely blind.

Literary estate
The Wienbibliothek im Rathaus (literally, "Vienna Library in the City Hall") accommodates fifteen boxes containing Grete von Urbanitzky's manuscripts. (There is also what sources describe as a "musical fragment".)

Output (selection) 

Her translation work into German drew on English, French and Italian authors. It included several works of Claude Anet.

Notes

References

Writers from Linz
Austrian novelists
1920s LGBT literature
1930s LGBT literature
Translators from English
Translators from French
Translators from Italian
Translators to German
Emigrants from Austria after the Anschluss
Emigrants from Nazi Germany to France
Emigrants from Nazi Germany to Switzerland
1891 births
1974 deaths
20th-century translators